Santa Isabel  is a town and municipality in the Tolima department of Colombia.  The population of the municipality was 6,220 as of the 1993 census.

Notable Person
Pedro Alonso López, serial killer 

Municipalities of Tolima Department